Kyle Kosier (born November 27, 1978) is a former American football guard who played in 143 games in the National Football League (NFL) for the San Francisco 49ers, Detroit Lions, and Dallas Cowboys. He played college football at Arizona State University.

Early and personal life
Kosier was born in Peoria, Arizona, to Keith (a recycler) and Marlene Kosier, and is Jewish, as is his mother. On discovering that Dallas Cowboys teammate Igor Olshansky was also Jewish, he said: "That's kind of cool to have a teammate share the same faith that I have".

Kosier attended Cactus High School in Glendale, Arizona, where he was a letterman in football, basketball, baseball, and track and graduated in 1997. In football, his athleticism allowed him to play middle linebacker at a bigger size than most players could. As a senior in 1996, he was named Class 4A All-State, the Arizona Republic named him to the All-Arizona Team, and KPNX-TV named him the 1996 Arizona Class 4A Defensive Player of the Year. He finished with 634 career tackles.

In 2011, he became the first football player to have his jersey retired by Cactus High School.

College career
Kosier accepted a scholarship from Arizona State University to play defensive end, but a shortage of offensive linemen made him convert to offensive guard as a redshirt freshman. The next year, he started the last two games of the season at right guard.

He was a starter at right guard as a junior and at right tackle as a senior, receiving honorable-mention All-Pac-10 honors.

Professional career

San Francisco 49ers
Kosier was selected by the San Francisco 49ers in seventh round (248th overall) of the 2002 NFL Draft. He played mostly on special teams as a rookie. The next year, he became a starter at both left guard and right tackle.

In 2003, he started 7 games at left guard, 3 at right guard and 2 at right tackle. The next year, he started 16 games rotating between left tackle (10 games) and right guard (6 games).

Detroit Lions
On April 19, 2005, the Detroit Lions signed him as a restricted free agent to a one-year contract, reuniting with his former 49ers head coach Steve Mariucci. The 49ers did not match the offer and received a seventh-round draft choice (#223-Marcus Maxwell) from the Lions as compensation.

Kosier was initially used by the team as a swing tackle, until being named the starting left guard for the last 11 games.

Dallas Cowboys
On March 11, 2006, he was signed as an unrestricted free agent by the Dallas Cowboys to a five-year, $15 million contract. Although the move was made to replace Larry Allen at left guard, it didn't get much acknowledgment because Kosier was a relatively unknown player. He started 80 games over six seasons, missing 13 games in 2008 with a hairline fracture in his right foot and 3 with knee/ankle injuries in 2010.

During the 2011 season, he was moved to right guard to help with the development of rookie right tackle Tyron Smith, who became a Pro Bowl alternate. Kosier played that year with a plantar fascia injury, before suffering a torn medial collateral ligament in his left knee in the last game of the regular season.

Throughout his Cowboys years, he always remained an important presence in the locker room, often getting recognition for the versatility, chemistry, and stability he provided to the offensive line. On March 19, 2012, he was released after becoming expendable with the signings of free agent offensive guards Mackenzy Bernadeau and Nate Livings. In his NFL career, he played in 143 games.

See also
List of select Jewish football players

References

External links
Arizona State Sun Devils bio

1978 births
Living people
People from Peoria, Arizona
Sportspeople from the Phoenix metropolitan area
Players of American football from Arizona
Jewish American sportspeople
American football offensive guards
American football offensive tackles
Arizona State Sun Devils football players
Dallas Cowboys players
Detroit Lions players
San Francisco 49ers players
21st-century American Jews
Ed Block Courage Award recipients